Lot 16 (pop. 550) is a township in Prince County, Prince Edward Island, Canada.  It is part of Richmond Parish.

Communities

Incorporated municipalities:

 St-Nicholas
 Wellington

Civic address communities:

 Belmont Lot 16
 Central Lot 16
 Miscouche
 Southwest Lot 16
 St-Nicholas
 St-Raphael
 Urbainville
 Wellington
 Wellington Centre

History
Lot 16 was awarded to three junior officers in the 1767 land lottery; and one quarter was granted to Loyalists in 1775.

The communities of Belmont Lot 16, Central Lot 16 and Southwest Lot 16 are some of the few communities in the province that use part of Samuel Holland's original township designation in their geographic name.

The Belmont United Baptist Church is located in Belmont Lot 16 and the Central Lot 16 United Church is located in Central Lot 16.  It also has three cemeteries (Methodist, United, and Baptist).

The Lot 16 Community Hall is located in Central Lot 16 and is a meeting place for community groups such as 4-H, Lot 16 Seniors Club, and the Women's Institute.

Belmont Provincial Park is located in Belmont Lot 16.  It is a day-use park located at Winchester Cape, a headland extending off the south shore of Malpeque Bay.

Economy
Agriculture is the main industry in Lot 16, with a large proportion of residents involved in primary agricultural production.  The most popular commodities are dairy, beef, potato, and grain production.  It is also home to a few small businesses that are primarily machinery related.

References

16
Geography of Prince County, Prince Edward Island